This is a list of science-fiction novels, novel series, and collections of linked short stories. It includes modern novels, as well as novels written before the term "science fiction" was in common use. This list includes novels not marketed as SF but still considered to be substantially science fiction in content by some critics, such as Nineteen Eighty-Four. As such, it is an inclusive list, not an exclusive list based on other factors such as level of notability or literary quality. Books are listed in alphabetical order by title, ignoring the leading articles "A", "An", and "The". Novel series are alphabetical by author-designated name or, if there is none, the title of the first novel in the series or some other reasonable designation.

0-9
 334 by Thomas M. Disch
 1Q84 by Haruki Murakami
 1632 series by Eric Flint
 2312 by Kim Stanley Robinson
 20,000 Leagues Under the Sea by Jules Verne

A
 A Beautifully Foolish Endeavor by Hank Green
 Absolution Gap by Alastair Reynolds
 Accelerando by Charles Stross
 Acidity by Nadeem F. Paracha
 Across the Universe by Beth Revis
 Adulthood Rites, Book Two of Xenogenesis Series by Octavia Butler
 After Doomsday by Poul Anderson
 Against the Fall of Night, by Arthur C. Clarke
 An Age by Brian Aldiss
 Age of Miracles (aka The Day of Star Cities, by John Brunner
 The Age of the Pussyfoot, by Frederik Pohl
 Air by Geoff Ryman
 Alas, Babylon by Pat Frank
 Alastor Cluster series by Jack Vance
 namely, Trullion: Alastor 2262, Marune: Alastor 933, and Wyst: Alastor 1716
 The Alejandra Variations by Paul Cook
 Aleriel, or A Voyage to Other Worlds by W. S. Lach-Szyrma
 The Algebraist by Iain M. Banks
 Alien Tongue by Stephen Leigh, essay by Rudy Rucker
 All You Need Is Kill by Hiroshi Sakurazaka
 Altered Carbon by Richard K. Morgan
 Ammonite by Nicola Griffith
 Amped by Daniel H. Wilson
 An Absolutely Remarkable Thing by Hank Green
 Ancient Echoes by Robert Holdstock
 Ancient Shores by Jack McDevitt
 Ancillary Justice by Ann Leckie
 Imperial Radch Series:  Ancillary Sword and Ancillary Mercy
 Andromeda by Ivan Efremov
 The Andromeda Strain by Michael Crichton
 Andymon by Angela and Karlheinz Steinmüller
 The Angry Espers by Lloyd Biggle, Jr.
 Anima by Marie Buchanan
 Animorphs by K. A. Applegate
 Annals of the Twenty-Ninth Century by Andrew Blair
 The Ant Men by Eric North
 Anthem by Ayn Rand
 Anthony Villiers series by Alexei Panshin
 namely, Star Well, The Thurb Revolution, and Masque World
 Ares Express by Ian McDonald
 Artemis by Andy Weir
 The Artist of the Beautiful by Nathaniel Hawthorne
 As the Green Star Rises by Lin Carter
 Asgard series by Brian Stableford
 namely, Asgard's Secret, Asgard's Conquerors, and Asgard's Heart
 Attack from Atlantis by Lester del Rey
 At the Goings Down of the Suns by Dominic Green
 Atlas Shrugged by Ayn Rand
 The Atrocity Exhibition by J. G. Ballard
 Autour de la Lune (also known as Around the Moon and Round the Moon) by Jules Verne
 Autumn Angels by Arthur Byron Cover
 Awakeners series by Sheri S. Tepper
 namely, Northshore and Southshore

B
 Babel-17 by Samuel R. Delany
 Bad Faith by Gillian Phillip
 The Bane of Yoto by Josh Viola
 Barefoot in the Head by Brian Aldiss
 Barsoom series by Edgar Rice Burroughs
 namely, A Princess of Mars, The Gods of Mars, The Warlord of Mars. Thuvia, Maid of Mars, The Chessmen of Mars, The Master Mind of Mars, A Fighting Man of Mars, Swords of Mars, Synthetic Men of Mars, Llana of Gathol, and John Carter of Mars
 Battle Angel Alita by Yukito Kishiro
 Battlefield Earth by L. Ron Hubbard
 The Beast Master by Andre Norton
 Becoming Alien by Rebecca Ore
 The Bell-Tower by Herman Melville
 Berserker by Fred Saberhagen
 Between Planets by Robert A. Heinlein
 Beyond Apollo by Barry N. Malzberg
 The Beyond the Red trilogy by Gabe (as Ava Jae)
 Bicentennial Man by Isaac Asimov
 Big Planet series by Jack Vance
 namely, Big Planet and Showboat World
 The Big Time by Fritz Leiber
 The Bikers series by Alex R. Stuart
 Binti series by Nnedi Okorafor 
 A Billion Days of Earth by Doris Piserchia
 Black by Ted Dekker
 Black Legion of Callisto by Lin Carter
 Blackstar by Josh Viola
 Blast Off at Woomera by Hugh Walters
 The Blind Worm by Brian Stableford
 Blood Music by Greg Bear
 Bloodchild and Other Stories by Octavia Butler
 The Blue Barbarians by Stanton A. Coblentz
 The Blue Man by Kin Platt
 The Blue World by Jack Vance
 Borgel by Daniel Pinkwater
 Born With the Dead by Robert Silverberg
 Borrowed Tides by Paul Levinson
 Brasyl by Ian McDonald
 Brave New World by Aldous Huxley
 Breakfast of Champions (or Goodbye, Blue Monday!)  by Kurt Vonnegut, Jr.
 Briah cycle by Gene Wolfe, several nested sub-series:
 The Book of the New Sun
 namely, The Shadow of the Torturer, The Claw of the Conciliator, The Sword of the Lictor, The Citadel of the Autarch, The Urth of the New Sun
 The Book of the Long Sun
 namely, Nightside the Long Sun, Lake of the Long Sun, Calde of the Long Sun, and Exodus from the Long Sun
 The Book of the Short Sun
 namely, On Blue's Waters, In Green's Jungles, and Return to the Whorl
 The Brick Moon by Edward Everett Hale
 Brother Termite by Patricia Anthony
 Bug Jack Barron by Norman Spinrad
 The Bull's Hour by Ivan Yefremov (a sequel to Andromeda)
 The Butterfly Kid by Chester Anderson
 By the Light of the Green Star by Lin Carter

C
 Cadwal Chronicles series by Jack Vance
 namely, Araminta Station, Ecce and Old Earth, and Throy
 Caesar's Column, by Ignatius Donnelly
 The Calcutta Chromosome by Amitav Ghosh
 Calling B for Butterfly by Louise Lawrence
 Camp Concentration by Thomas M. Disch
 The Canopy of Time by Brian W. Aldiss
 A Canticle for Leibowitz by Walter M. Miller Jr.
 Carnival by Elizabeth Bear
 A Case of Conscience by James Blish
 Cat Country by Lao She
 Cat's Cradle by Kurt Vonnegut, Jr.
 The Caves of Steel by Isaac Asimov (the sequel is The Naked Sun)
 Celestial Matters by Richard Garfinkle
 Cemetery World by Clifford D. Simak
 The Centauri Device by M. John Harrison
 Century Rain by Alastair Reynolds
 The Chalk Giants by Keith Roberts
 The Changeling by A. E. van Vogt
 Chanur series by C. J. Cherryh
 namely, The Pride of Chanur, Chanur's Venture, The Kif Strike Back, Chanur's Homecoming, and Chanur's Legacy
 Chasm City by Alastair Reynolds
 Child of Fortune by Norman Spinrad
 Childhood's End by Arthur C. Clarke
 Children of Time by Adrian Tchaikovsky
 series, Children of Ruin and Children of Memory
 Children of Tomorrow by A. E. van Vogt
 Chromosome 6 by Robin Cook
 Chronocules by D. G. Compton
 The Chrysalids by John Wyndham
 Cinnabar by Edward Bryant
 Cirque by Terry Carr
 Citizen of the Galaxy by Robert A. Heinlein
 City by Clifford D. Simak
 The City and the Stars by Arthur C. Clarke
 City of Bones by Martha Wells
 City of Illusions by Ursula K. Le Guin
 The City Outside the World by Lin Carter
 Clans of the Alphane Moon by Philip K. Dick
 Clay's Ark by Octavia Butler
 A Clockwork Orange by Anthony Burgess
 Close to Critical by Hal Clement
 Coalescent by Stephen Baxter
 Code of the Lifemaker by James P. Hogan
 Colony by Ben Bova
 The Complete Magnus Ridolph by Jack Vance
 Congo by Michael Crichton
 The Consciousness Plague by Paul Levinson
 Consider Phlebas by Iain M. Banks 
 Contact by Carl Sagan
 Count Zero by William Gibson
 Cradle by Arthur C. Clarke and Gentry Lee
 Cradle of the Sun by Brian Stableford
 Creatures of Light and Darkness by Roger Zelazny
 The Crossroads of Time by Andre Norton
 Cryptonomicon by Neal Stephenson
 also The Baroque Cycle, namely Quicksilver, The Confusion, and The System of the World
 Crystal Rain by Tobias S. Buckell
 Crystal Witness by Kathy Tyers
 Cuckoo's Egg by C. J. Cherryh
 Culture series by Iain M. Banks
 namely, Consider Phlebas, The Player of Games, Use of Weapons, The State of the Art, Excession, Inversions, Look to Windward, Matter, Surface Detail, The Hydrogen Sonata
 The Currents of Space by Isaac Asimov
 Cyteen by C. J. Cherryh

D 
 Daedalus Mission series by Brian Stableford
 namely, The Florians, Critical Threshold, Wildeblood's Empire, The City of the Sun, Balance of Power, and The Paradox of the Sets
Daemon by Daniel Suarez
Damnation Alley by Roger Zelazny
 The Dancers of Noyo by Margaret St. Clair
 Dancing Jack by Laurie J. Marks
 Danger: Dinosaurs! by Richard Marsten
 Danny Dunn series by Raymond Abrashkin and Jay Williams
 namely, Danny Dunn and the Anti-Gravity Paint, Danny Dunn on a Desert Island, Danny Dunn and the Homework Machine, Danny Dunn and the Weather Machine, Danny Dunn on the Ocean Floor, Danny Dunn and the Fossil Cave, Danny Dunn and the Heat Ray, Danny Dunn, Time Traveler, Danny Dunn and the Automatic House, Danny Dunn and the Voice From Space, Danny Dunn and the Smallifying Machine, Danny Dunn and the Swamp Monster, Danny Dunn, Invisible Boy, Danny Dunn Scientific Detective, Danny Dunn and the Universal Glue
 Dark Beyond the Stars by Frank M. Robinson
 Dark Universe by Daniel F. Galouye
 The Darwin Elevator by Jason M. Hough
 Darwin's Radio by Greg Bear
 Dawn, Book One of the Xenogenesis Series by Octavia Butler
 The Day of the Star Cities (aka Age of Miracles by John Brunner
 The Day of the Triffids by John Wyndham
 Days of Grass by Tanith Lee
 The Deadly Sky by Doris Piserchia
 The Defiant Agents by Andre Norton (the sequel to Galactic Derelict)
 Delta-v by Daniel Suarez
 The Demolished Man by Alfred Bester
 Demon by John Varley
 Demon Princes series by Jack Vance
 namely, Star King, The Killing Machine, The Palace of Love, The Face, and The Book of Dreams
 Le Dernier Homme (also known as The Last Man and Omegarus and Syderia: A Romance in Futurity) by Jean-Baptiste Cousin de Grainville
 Desolation Road by Ian McDonald
 Desolation Called Peace by Arkady Martine
 Destination Alpha Four by Dominic Green
 Destination Mars by Hugh Walters
 Destination: Void by Frank Herbert
 Dhalgren by Samuel R. Delany
 The Diamond Age by Neal Stephenson
 The Diamond Lens by Fitz James O'Brien
 Dies the Fire by S. M. Stirling
 Dies Irae series by Brian Stableford
 namely, The Days of Glory, In the Kingdom of the Beasts, and Day of Wrath
 Digital Devil Story by Aya Nishitani.
 The Dimensioneers by Doris Piserchia
 The Disappearance by Philip Wylie
 The Dispossessed by Ursula K. Le Guin
 Distress by Greg Egan
 Divergent trilogy
 Do Androids Dream of Electric Sheep? by Philip K. Dick
 Dog On The Highway by Dominic Green
 The Domes of Pico by Hugh Walters
 Doomsday Book by Connie Willis
 The Dosadi Experiment by Frank Herbert
 Down and Out in the Magic Kingdom by Cory Doctorow
 Down to a Sunless Sea by David Graham
 Downbelow Station by C. J. Cherryh
 The Dragon Masters by Jack Vance
 The Dragon Never Sleeps by Glen Cook
 Dragonriders of Pern by Anne McCaffrey and Todd McCaffrey
 Drake Maijstral series by Walter Jon Williams
 namely, The Crown Jewels, House of Shards, and Rock of Ages
 Dream Park by Larry Niven and Steven Barnes
 Dream Park; The Voodoo Game by Larry Niven and Steven Barnes
 Dreamsnake by Vonda N. McIntyre
 The Drowned World by J. G. Ballard
 The Dry Salvages by Caitlín R. Kiernan
 Duende Meadow by Paul Cook
 Dune by Frank Herbert
 also Dune Messiah, Children of Dune, God Emperor of Dune, Heretics of Dune, and Chapterhouse: Dune
 Durdane series by Jack Vance
 namely, The Anome (a.k.a. The Faceless Man), The Brave Free Men (a.k.a. The Roguskhoi), and The Asutra
 Dying Inside by Robert Silverberg

E
 Earth Abides by George R. Stewart
 Earth Child by Doris Piserchia
 Earth in Twilight by Doris Piserchia
 Earth Logic by Laurie J. Marks
 Earthborn by Orson Scott Card
 Earthbound by Milton Lesser
 Earthman, Go Home! by Poul Anderson
 Earthseed by Pamela Sargent
 Echo in the Skull by John Brunner
 Einstein's Dreams by Alan Lightman
 Elemental series by Laurie J. Marks
 namely, Fire Logic, Earth Logic, Water Logic
 Emergence by David R. Palmer
 Emortality series by Brian Stableford
 namely, The Cassandra Complex, Inherit the Earth, Architects of Emortality, Fountains of Youth, Dark Ararat, and The Omega Expedition
 Emphyrio by Jack Vance
 Empire by Orson Scott Card
 Empire of the Atom by A. E. van Vogt
 En Iniya Iyanthira by Sujatha
 also Meendum Jeano
 The End of Eternity by Isaac Asimov
 Ender's Game by Orson Scott Card
 also Speaker for the Dead, Xenocide, Children of the Mind, Ender's Shadow, Shadow Puppets, Shadow of the Hegemon, Shadow of the Giant, and Ender in Exile
 The Enemy Stars by Poul Anderson
 Eon by Greg Bear
 Erewhon by Samuel Butler
 Escape to Witch Mountain by Alexander Key
 Eternity Road by Jack McDevitt
 Excession by Iain M. Banks
 Exit Funtopia by Mick Farren
 Exit Pursued by a Bee by Geoff Nelder
 The Exodus Towers by Jason M. Hough
 Expedition Venus by Hugh Walters
 The Eye of the Heron by Ursula K. Le Guin
 The Eyes series by Stuart Gordon

F
 The Facts in the Case of M. Valdemar by Edgar Allan Poe
 Faded Sun series by C. J. Cherryh
 namely, Kesrith, Shon'jir, and Kutath
 Fahrenheit 451 by Ray Bradbury
 A Fall of Moondust by Arthur C. Clarke
 Farewell Horizontal by K. W. Jeter
 Farnham's Freehold by Robert A. Heinlein
 Fearful Symmetries by S. Andrew Swann
 Feersum Endjinn by Iain M. Banks
 The Female Man by Joanna Russ
 The Fifth Head of Cerberus by Gene Wolfe
 The Fifth Sacred Thing by Starhawk
 Find the Feathered Serpent by Evan Hunter
 Fire Logic by Laurie J. Marks
 Firebird by Kathy Tyers
 also Fusion Fire and Crown of Fire
 First Men in the Moon by H. G. Wells
 Five Against Venus by Philip Latham (nom de plume of Robert S. Richardson)
 Five Weeks in a Balloon by Jules Verne
 Fledgling by Octavia Butler
 Flight from Rebirth by J. T. McIntosh
 The Flight of the Dragonfly (Rocheworld) by Robert Forward
 Flow My Tears, The Policeman Said by Philip K. Dick
 Flowers for Algernon (novel version) by Daniel Keyes
 The Fluger by Doris Piserchia
 Fool's Run by Patricia A. McKillip
 Fortress on the Sun by Paul Cook
 Fossil by Hal Clement
 The Forever War by Joe Haldeman
 also Forever Free, Forever Peace
 Foundation by Isaac Asimov
 also Foundation and Empire, Second Foundation, Foundation's Edge, Foundation and Earth, Prelude to Foundation (prequel), and Forward the Foundation (prequel)
 Frankenstein by Mary Shelley
 Free Live Free by Gene Wolfe
 Friday by Robert A. Heinlein
 De la Terre a la Lune (also known as From the Earth to the Moon) by Jules Verne
 The Futurological Congress by Stanisław Lem

G
 Galactic Derelict by Andre Norton (the sequel to The Time Traders)
 Galactic Effectuator by Jack Vance
 Galaxies Like Grains of Sand by Brian W. Aldiss
 The Gap Cycle by Stephen R. Donaldson
 Garden of Rama by Arthur C. Clarke
 Gateway by Frederik Pohl
 Genesis Alpha by Rune Michaels (2007)
 Give Warning to the World by John Brunner (see Echo in the Skull)
 The Giver
 Gladiator by Philip Wylie
 Gladiator-At-Law by C. M. Kornbluth and Frederik Pohl
 The Glass Bees by Ernst Jünger
 Glory Road by Robert A. Heinlein
 Gods of Riverworld by Philip José Farmer
 The Gods Themselves by Isaac Asimov
 The Golden Age by John C. Wright
 The Golden Globe by John Varley
 Gone series by Michael Grant
 Grass by Sheri S. Tepper
 The Gray Prince by Jack Vance
 The Great Explosion by Eric Frank Russell
 The Great Fetish by L. Sprague de Camp
   Greener than you think by Ward Moore
 Gridlinked by Neal Asher
 The Gripping Hand by Larry Niven and Jerry Pournelle. Released as The Moat Around Murcheson's Eye in the United Kingdom.
 Gulf by Robert A. Heinlein

H
 Halo – a video-game novelization series
 namely, Halo: The Fall of Reach by Eric Nylund, Halo: The Flood by William C. Dietz, Halo: First Strike by Eric Nylund, Halo: Ghosts of Onyx by Eric Nylund, Halo: The Cole Protocol by Tobias S. Buckell, Halo: Contact Harvest by Joseph Staten, Halo: Evolutions (Essential Stories From The Halo Universe) by various authors, Halo: Evolutions (Volume 2) by various authors, Halo: Cryptum by Greg Bear.
 Halo by Paul Cook
 Halting State by Charles Stross
 The Hammer of Darkness by L. E. Modesitt
 The Hampdenshire Wonder by J. D. Beresford
 The Handmaid's Tale by Margaret Atwood
 The Haunted Stars by Edmond Hamilton
 Have Spacesuit, Will Travel by Robert A. Heinlein
 Hawken Family series by Michael Williams
 namely, Arcady and Allamanda
 He, She and It by Marge Piercy
 Helliconia trilogy by Brian W. Aldiss
 comprising Helliconia Spring, Helliconia Summer, and Helliconia Winter
 Hellspark by Janet Kagan
 Hidden World by Stanton A. Coblentz
 The High Crusade by Poul Anderson
 Highway of Eternity by Clifford Simak
 His Master's Voice by Stanisław Lem
 The Hitchhiker's Guide to the Galaxy series by Douglas Adams
 namely, The Hitchhiker's Guide to the Galaxy; The Restaurant at the End of the Universe; Life, the Universe and Everything; So Long, and Thanks for All the Fish; and Mostly Harmless; continued by Eoin Colfier with And Another Thing
 Homesmind by Pamela Sargent
 The Honour of the Knights by Stephen J Sweeney
 Hooded Swan series by Brian Stableford
 namely, Halcyon Drift, Rhapsody in Black, Promised Land, The Paradise Game, The Fenris Device, and Swan Song
 The House of the Scorpion by Nancy Farmer
 The Houses of Iszm by Jack Vance
 How I Overcame My Gravity by Fitz James O'Brien
 The Hunger Games series by Suzanne Collins
 The Hydrogen Sonata by Iain M. Banks
 Hyperion by Dan Simmons
 also The Fall of Hyperion, Endymion, and The Rise of Endymion

I
 I Am Legend by Richard Matheson
 I, Robot by Isaac Asimov
 Idlewild by Nick Sagan
 Ilium by Dan Simmons
 also Olympos
 Imago, Book Three of the Xenogenesis Series by Octavia Butler
 Imperial Earth by Arthur C. Clarke
 Implosion by D.F. Jones
 In Solitary by Garry Kilworth
 In the Country of the Blind by Michael F. Flynn
 In the Courts of the Crimson Kings by S. M. Stirling
 Inferno by Larry Niven and Jerry Pournelle
 In the Green Star's Glow by Lin Carter
 The Infinite Man by Daniel F. Galouye
 Infinity Beach by Jack McDevitt. Released as Slow Lightning in the United Kingdom.
 Inquestor series by Somtow Sucharitkul
 namely, Light on the Sound, The Throne of Madness, Utopia Hunters, and The Darkling Wind
 The Integral Trees by Larry Niven
 Inter Ice Age 4 by Abe Kōbō
 Into the Drowning Deep by Mira Grant
 Into the Slave Nebula by John Brunner
 The Intuitionist by Con Whitehead
 The Invention of Morel by Adolfo Bioy Casares
 Inversions by Iain M. Banks
 Iron Council by China Miéville
 Iron Sunrise by Charles Stross
 The Island of Doctor Moreau by H. G. Wells
 Islands in the Sky by Arthur C. Clarke
 Isle of the Dead by Roger Zelazny

J
 J. by William Sanders
 Jandar of Callisto by Lin Carter
 The Jedi Academy Trilogy by Kevin J. Anderson
 Jem, a 1980 book by Frederik Pohl
 Jennifer Government by Max Barry
 A Journey in Other Worlds by John Jacob Astor IV
 Journey to the Center of the Earth by Jules Verne
 Journey to Jupiter by Hugh Walters
 Journey to Mars by Gustavus W. Pope
 Journey to Venus by Gustavus W. Pope
 Jurassic Park by Michael Crichton

K
 The Kaiju Preservation Society by John Scalzi
 Kaleidoscope Century by John Barnes
 Kalimantaan by Lucius Shepard
 Killobyte by Piers Anthony
 The Kin of Ata Are Waiting for You, by Dorothy Bryant
 Kindred by Octavia Butler
 King of Morning, Queen of Day by Ian McDonald
 King Rat by China Miéville (arguably fantasy)
 Knight of Delusions by Keith Laumer
 The Kraken Wakes (a.k.a. Out of the Deeps) by John Wyndham

L
 Langdon St. Ives series by James Blaylock
 namely, Homunculus, Lord Kelvin's Machine, and The Digging Leviathan
 The Languages of Pao by Jack Vance
 Lankar of Callisto by Lin Carter
 Last and First Men by Olaf Stapledon
 The Last Castle by Jack Vance
 The Lathe of Heaven by Ursula K. Le Guin
 League of Peoples series by James Alan Gardner
 namely, Expendable, Commitment Hour, Vigilant, Hunted, Ascending, Trapped, Radiant
 Learning the World by Ken MacLeod
 The Left Hand of Darkness by Ursula K. Le Guin
 The Legacy of Heorot by Larry Niven, Jerry Pournelle and Steven Barnes
 Lensman series by E. E. Smith
 namely, Triplanetary, First Lensman, Galactic Patrol, Gray Lensman, Second Stage Lensmen, and Children of the Lens
 Level 7 by Mordecai Roshwald
 Light by M. John Harrison
 The Light Brigade by Kameron Hurley
 Little Fuzzy by H. Beam Piper
 Lone Star Planet by H. Beam Piper and John J. McGuire (see A Planet for Texans)
 The Long Way to a Small, Angry Planet, by Becky Chambers
 Look to Windward by Iain M. Banks
 Looking Backward by Edward Bellamy
 Lord Kalvan of Otherwhen by H. Beam Piper
 Lord of Light by Roger Zelazny
 Lords of the Psychon by Daniel F. Galouye
 Lords of the Starship by Mark S. Geston
 The Lost Fleet series by Jack Campbell
 The Lost Planet by Angus MacVicar
 The Lost World by Michael Crichton
 The Lost World by Arthur Conan Doyle
 Lovelock by Orson Scott Card and Kathryn H. Kidd
 Lucky Starr series by Isaac Asimov (writing as Paul French)
 namely, David Starr, Space Ranger, Lucky Starr and the Pirates of the Asteroids, Lucky Starr and the Oceans of Venus, Lucky Starr and the Big Sun of Mercury, Lucky Starr and the Moons of Jupiter, and Lucky Starr and the Rings of Saturn
 Lydyard series by Brian Stableford
 namely, The Werewolves of London, The Angel of Pain, and The Carnival of Destruction

M
 Macroscope by Piers Anthony
 Mad Empress of Callisto by Lin Carter
 Majipoor series by Robert Silverberg
 namely, Lord Valentine's Castle, Valentine Pontifex, Majipoor Chronicles; there are more but of debated quality
 Make Room! Make Room! by Harry Harrison
 The Malacia Tapestry by Brian W. Aldiss
 Mammoth by John Varley
 Man in a Cage by Brian Stableford
 The Man in the High Castle by Philip K. Dick
 Man Plus by Frederik Pohl
 The Man Who Fell to Earth by Walter Tevis
 The Man Who Folded Himself by David Gerrold
 The Man Who Loved Mars by Lin Carter
 The Map of Time by Felix J. Palma
 Marooned on Mars by Lester del Rey
 The Mars trilogy by Kim Stanley Robinson
 The Martian by Andy Weir
 The Martian Chronicles by Ray Bradbury
 Maske: Thaery by Jack Vance
 The Master by T. H. White
 Masters of Time by A. E. van Vogt
 Matter by Iain M. Banks
 A Maze of Death by Philip K. Dick
 The Maze Runner
Mecha Samurai Empire series by Peter Tieryas
 Meendum Jeano by Sujatha
 A Meeting at Corvallis by S. M. Stirling
 Mellonta Tauta by Edgar Allan Poe
 The Memory of Earth by Orson Scott Card
 also The Call of Earth, The Ships of Earth, Earthfall, Earthborn
 Memory Called Empire by Arkady Martine
 The Merchant and the Alchemist's Gate by Ted Chiang
 The Midnight Dancers by Gerard F. Conway
 Midshipman's Hope by David Feintuch
 see the Seafort Saga for its sequels
 The Midwich Cuckoos by John Wyndham
 Millennium by John Varley
 A Million Open Doors by John Barnes
 The Mind Cage by A. E. van Vogt
 Mind of My Mind by Octavia Butler
 The Mind Riders by Brian Stableford
 Mind Wizards of Callisto by Lin Carter
 Mirabile by Janet Kagan
 Missing Men of Saturn by Philip Latham (nom de plume of Robert S. Richardson)
 Mission Earth by L. Ron Hubbard
 Mission of Gravity by Hal Clement
 Mists of Dawn by Chad Oliver
 The Moat Around Murcheson's Eye by Larry Niven and Jerry Pournelle (this was the United Kingdom title, elsewhere it is known as The Gripping Hand)
 The Modular Man by Roger MacBride Allen, essay by Isaac Asimov
 Mona Lisa Overdrive by William Gibson
 The Moon and the Face by Patricia A. McKillip
 Moon Base One by Hugh Walters
 The Moon Is a Harsh Mistress by Robert A. Heinlein
 Moon of Mutiny by Lester del Rey
 Moon of Three Rings by Andre Norton
 Moon-Flash by Patricia A. McKillip
 More Than Human by Theodore Sturgeon
 The Moreau Quartet by S. Andrew Swann
 The Morgaine Stories by C. J. Cherryh
 namely, Gate of Ivrel, Well of Shiuan, Fires of Azeroth, and Exile's Gate
 The Mote in God's Eye by Larry Niven and Jerry Pournelle
 Mountains Oceans and Giants by Alfred Döblin
 Mr. Justice by Doris Piserchia
 The Mummy! - A Tale of the Twenty-Second Century by J. Webb
 Mutiny in the Time Machine by Donald Keith
 The Mysterious Planet by Kenneth Wright
 Mystery of the Third Mine by Robert W. Lowndes
 Mythago Wood series by Robert Holdstock
 namely, Mythago Wood, Lavondyss, The Bone Forest, The Hollowing, Merlin's Wood, and Gate of Ivory, Gate of Horn

N
 The Narrative of Arthur Gordon Pym of Nantucket (also known as The Narrative of Arthur Gordon Pym's Adventures) by Edgar Allan Poe
 Native Tongue by Suzette Haden Elgin
 Neanderthal Planet by Brian W. Aldiss
 NEQUA or The Problem of the Ages by Jack Adams
 Neuromancer by William Gibson
 Never Let Me Go by Kazuo Ishiguro
 Neverness series by David Zindell
 namely, Neverness, The Broken God, The Wild, and War in Heaven
 The New Atlantis by Sir Francis Bacon
 News from Nowhere by William Morris
 Next by Michael Crichton
 Nightfall by Isaac Asimov & Robert Silverberg
 Nineteen Eighty-Four by George Orwell
 Night Lamp by Jack Vance
 Night of Light by Philip Jose Farmer
 Nightwings by Robert Silverberg
 Ninth Step Station, created by Malka Older
 The Nome Trilogy by Terry Pratchett
 namely, Truckers, Diggers, and Wings
 Norstrilia by Cordwainer Smith
 Noughts & Crosses series by Malorie Blackman
 Nova by Samuel R. Delany
 Nova Swing by M. John Harrison
 Null-A Three by A. E. van Vogt

O
 Ocean on Top by Hal Clement
 Odd John by Olaf Stapledon
 Oh. My. Gods. by Tera Lynn Childs
 The Old Lie by Claire G. Coleman
 Old Man's War by John Scalzi
 Omega by Jack McDevitt
 On the Beach by Nevil Shute
 On the Silver Globe by Jerzy Żuławski
 On Wings of Song by Thomas M. Disch
 One in Three Hundred by J. T. McIntosh
 One Million Tomorrows by Bob Shaw
 One Mind's Eye by Kathy Tyers
 Operation Columbus by Hugh Walters
 The Ophiuchi Hotline by John Varley
 Optiman by Brian Stableford
 Oryx and Crake by Margaret Atwood.
 Otherland series by Tad Williams
 namely, City of Golden Shadow, River of Blue Fire, Mountain of Black Glass, and Sea of Silver Light
 Out of the Deeps (a.k.a. The Kraken Wakes) by John Wyndham
 Out of the Silent Planet by C. S. Lewis
 The Outlaws of Mars by Otis Adelbert Kline

P
 Parable of the Sower by Octavia Butler
 Parable of the Talents by Octavia Butler
 Pastwatch: The Redemption of Christopher Columbus by Orson Scott Card
 Patternmaster by Octavia Butler
 The Patterns of Chaos by Colin Kapp
 Pavane by Keith Roberts
 The Pawns of Null-A also published as The Players of Null-A by A. E. van Vogt
 Pebble in the Sky by Isaac Asimov
 Percy Jackson & the Olympians series by Rick Riordan
 namely, The Lightning Thief, The Sea of Monsters, The Titan's Curse, The Battle of the Labyrinth, and The Last Olympian
 Perdido Street Station by China Miéville
 Permanence by Karl Schroeder
 Permutation City by Greg Egan
 The Pixel Eye by Paul Levinson
 The Plague Forge by Jason M. Hough
 A Plague of Demons by Keith Laumer
 Plague Ship by Andre Norton
 A Planet for Texans by H. Beam Piper and John J. McGuire
 Planet of Adventure series by Jack Vance
 namely, City of the Chasch (a.k.a. The Chasck), Servants of the Wanek (a.k.a. Servants of the Wankh, The Wankh), The Dirdir, and The Pnume
 Planet of the Apes by Pierre Boulle 
 Planet of Exile by Ursula K. Le Guin
 Planet of Light by Raymond F. Jones (the sequel to Son of the Stars)
 The Player of Games by Iain M. Banks
 Player Piano by Kurt Vonnegut
 The Pleasures of a Futuroscope by Lord Dunsany
 The Plot To Save Socrates by Paul Levinson
 Podkayne of Mars by Robert A. Heinlein
 Polaris by Jack McDevitt
 Ports of Call series by Jack Vance
 namely, Ports of Call and Lurulu
 The Positronic Man by Isaac Asimov
 The Postman by David Brin
 Postmarked the Stars by Andre Norton
 The Prefect by Alastair Reynolds
 The Prestige by Christopher Priest
 Prey by Michael Crichton
 The Princes of the Air by John M. Ford
 Prisoners of Power by Arkady and Boris Strugatsky
 Project Hail Mary by Andy Weir
 A Prophetic Romance by John McCoy
 Protector by Larry Niven
 The Protector's War by S. M. Stirling
 Proxima by Stephen Baxter
 Psion series by Joan D. Vinge
 namely, Psion, Catspaw, and Dreamfall
 The Puppet Masters by Robert Heinlein
 Pushing Ice by Alastair Reynolds
 The Puzzle Planet by Robert A. W. Lowndes

Q
 Quarantine by Greg Egan
 Queen of Angels (novel) by Greg Bear
 Quest Crosstime by Andre Norton
 Quest for the Future by A. E. van Vogt
 Quietus by Tristan Palmgren
 Quinzinzinzili by Régis Messac (French page on Messac)

R
 R.U.R. (Rossum's Universal Robots) by Karel Čapek
 Radix Tetrad series by A. A. Attanasio
 namely, Radix, In Other Worlds, Arc of the Dream, and The Last Legends of Earth
 Raising the Stones by Sheri S. Tepper
 Rappaccini's Daughter by Nathaniel Hawthorne
 Ready Player One by Ernest Cline
 Ready Player Two by Ernest Cline
 The Realms of Tartarus by Brian Stableford
 Red by Ted Dekker
 Red Planet by Robert A. Heinlein
 Red Thunder by John Varley
 Redemption Ark by Alastair Reynolds
 Remembrance of Earth's Past by Liu Cixin
 Rendezvous with Rama by Arthur C. Clarke
 Renegade of Callisto by Lin Carter
 Report on Probability A by Brian W. Aldiss
 Revelation Space by Alastair Reynolds
 Revolt on Alpha C by Robert Silverberg
 Ringworld by Larry Niven
 also The Ringworld Engineers, The Ringworld Throne, Ringworld's Children The Rise of Renegade X by Chelsea M. Campbell
 Rite of Passage by Alexei Panshin
 Roadmarks by Roger Zelazny
 Roadside Picnic by Arkady and Boris Strugatsky
 The Roar by Emma Clayton
 Robopocalypse by Daniel H. Wilson
 Robots of Dawn by Isaac Asimov
 Rocannon's World by Ursula K. Le Guin
 Rocheworld by Robert Forward
 Rocket Jockey by Philip St. John
 Rocket to Limbo by Alan E. Nourse
 Rocket to Luna by Richard Marsten
 Rockets to Nowhere by Philip St. John
 Rocketship Galileo by Robert A. Heinlein
 Roderick and Roderick at Random by John Sladek
 The Rolling Stones by Robert A. Heinlein
 Rosewater series by Tade Thompson 
 Rule 34 by Charles Stross
 Rumors of Spring by Richard Grant
 Rynosseros by Terry Dowling

S
 Samaria series by Sharon Shinn
 namely, Archangel, Jovah's Angel, The Alleluia Files, and Angelica The Sands of Mars by Arthur C. Clarke
 Santiago by Mike Resnick
 Saraband of Lost Time by Richard Grant
 Sargasso of Space by Andre Norton
 Saturn's Children by Charles Stross
 Saucerers and Gondoliers by Dominic Green
 A Scanner Darkly, by Philip K. Dick
 The Scar by China Miéville (arguably fantasy)
 Schismatrix, by Bruce Sterling
 Scissors Cut Paper Wrap Stone by Ian McDonald
 The Scourge of God by S. M. Stirling
 A Scourge of Screamers by Daniel F. Galouye
 Search the Sky by Cyril M. Kornbluth and Frederik Pohl
 The Secret of the Martian Moons by Donald A. Wollheim
 The Secret of the Ninth Planet by Donald A. Wollheim
 The Secret of Saturn's Rings by Donald A. Wollheim
 Semper Mars by Ian Douglas
 Sentinels From Space by Eric Frank Russell
 Seveneves by Neal Stephenson
 Sewer, Gas, and Electric by Matt Ruff
 Shade's Children, by Garth Nix
 Shadrach in the Furnace by Robert Silverberg
 The Shape of Things to Come, by H. G. Wells
 The Shibboleth by John Hornor Jacobs 
 The Ship Who Sang by Anne McCaffrey
 Shivering World by Kathy Tyers
 The Shockwave Rider by John Brunner
 Side Show by Sheri S. Tepper
 Signal, by Cynthia DeFelice
 Signs of Life by M. John Harrison
 The Silk Code by Paul Levinson
 The Silkie by A. E. van Vogt
 Simulacron-3 by Daniel F. Galouye
 Sinister Barrier by Eric Frank Russell
 The Sirens of Titan by Kurt Vonnegut
 Sister Ships and Alastair by Dominic Green
 Six Gates from Limbo by J. T. McIntosh
 Six Wakes by Mur Lafferty
 Sixth Column by Robert A. Heinlein
 The Sky People by S. M. Stirling
 Sky Pirates of Callisto by Lin Carter
 Slan by A. E. van Vogt
 Slaughterhouse-Five by Kurt Vonnegut
 Slaves of the Klau (a.k.a. Gold and Iron) by Jack Vance
 Slow Lightning by Jack McDevitt. Released as Infinity Beach in the United States.
 Snow Crash by Neal Stephenson
 The Snow Queen by Joan D. Vinge
 Snow White and the Giants by J. T. McIntosh
 Solaris by Stanisław Lem
 Solitaire by Kelley Eskridge
 Something Wicked This Way Comes by Ray Bradbury
 Son of Man by Robert Silverberg
 Son of the Stars by Raymond F. Jones (the sequel is Planet of Light)
 Son of the Tree by Jack Vance
 The Song of Phaid the Gambler by Mick Farren
 The Songs of Distant Earth by Arthur C. Clarke
 Sons of the Ocean Deeps by Bryce Walton
 Space Cadet by Robert A. Heinlein
 The Space Merchants by Frederik Pohl and C.M. Kornbluth
 The Space Odyssey by Arthur C. Clarke
 Space Opera by Jack Vance
 Space Trilogy series by C. S. Lewis
 namely, Out of the Silent Planet, Perelandra (a.k.a. Voyage to Venus), and That Hideous Strength The Space Vampires by Colin Wilson
 Space Viking by H. Beam Piper
 Spaceling by Doris Piserchia
 Spacemen, Go Home by Milton Lesser
 Spaceship Medic by Harry Harrison
 Speaker for the Dead by Orson Scott Card
 also Shadow of the Hegemon, Shadow Puppets, Shadow of the Giant, Shadows in Flight Sphere by Michael Crichton
 Spin by Robert Charles Wilson
 Stadium Beyond the Stars by Milton Lesser
 The Stainless Steel Rat by Harry Harrison
 also The Stainless Steel Rat's Revenge, The Stainless Steel Rat Saves the World, The Stainless Steel Rat Wants You, The Stainless Steel Rat for President, A Stainless Steel Rat Is Born, The Stainless Steel Rat Gets Drafted, The Stainless Steel Rat Sings the Blues, The Stainless Steel Rat Goes to Hell, The Stainless Steel Rat Joins the Circus Stalker by Boris and Arkady Strugatsky
 Stand on Zanzibar by John Brunner
 Star Born by Andre Norton (the sequel to The Stars Are Ours)
 The Star Conquerors by Ben Bova
 Star Gate by Andre Norton
 Star Guard by Andre Norton
 Star of Gypsies by Robert Silverberg
 The Star of Life by Edmond Hamilton
 Star of the Unborn by Franz Werfel
 Star Maker by Olaf Stapledon
 Star Man's Son (AKA, Daybreak 2250) by Andre Norton
 Star Rangers by Andre Norton
 Star Rider by Doris Piserchia
 The Star Seekers by Milton Lesser
 Star Smashers of the Galaxy Rangers by Harry Harrison
 Star Surgeon by Alan E. Nourse
 Starman Jones by Robert A. Heinlein
 The Stars Are Ours! by Andre Norton (the sequel is Star Born)
 Stars are Legion by Kameron Hurley
 The Stars, Like Dust by Isaac Asimov
 The Stars My Destination by Alfred Bester
 Starship Through Space by Lee Correy (nom de plume of G. Harry Stine)
 Starship Troopers by Robert A. Heinlein
 The State of the Art by Iain M. Banks
 State of Fear by Michael Crichton
 The Status Civilization by Robert Sheckley
 The Steam Man of the Prairies by Edward S. Ellis
 Steel Beach by John Varley
 Step to the Stars by Lester del Rey
 The Stepford Wives by Ira Levin
 The Steps of the Sun by Walter Tevis
 Stories of Your Life and Others by Ted Chiang
 Storm Over Warlock by Andre Norton
 Stranger in a Strange Land by Robert A. Heinlein
 Strata by Terry PratchettSultana's Dream (1905) by Begum Rokheya Sakhawat Hossain The Sunrise Lands by S. M. Stirling
 The Super Barbarians by John Brunner
 Supermind by A. E. van Vogt
 Surface Detail by Iain M. Banks
 Sword of Truth series by Terry Goodkind
 Wizard's First Rule, Stone of Tears, Blood of the Fold, Temple of the Winds, Soul of the Fire, Faith of the Fallen, Pillars of Creation, Naked Empire, Chainfire, Phantom, Confessor, The Omen Machine, Debt of Bones, The First Confessor: The Legend of Magda Searus The Syndic by C. M. Kornbluth
 Synners by Pat Cadigan

T
 Tactics of Mistake by Gordon R. Dickson
 A Tale of the Ragged Mountains by Edgar Allan Poe
 Tatja Grimm's World by Vernor Vinge
 Tau Zero by Poul Anderson
 Telzey Amberdon by James H. Schmitz
 Template by Matthew Hughes
 Terror by Satellite by Hugh Walters
 tetraktus, the Damn Four (in Persian :تتراكتوس، چهار لعنتي Titrāktūs Chahār La‘natī) by Reza Khoshnazar
 That Extraordinary Day by Predrag Vukadinović
 Thebes of the Hundred Gates by Robert Silverberg
 There Ain't Gonna Be No World War Three by Dominic Green
 There Are Doors by Gene Wolfe
 They Shall Have Stars by James Blish
 The Third Craft by James T. Harris
 This Immortal by Roger Zelazny
 This Island Earth by Raymond F. Jones
 This Perfect Day by Ira Levin
 Thorns by Robert Silverberg
 The Three Stigmata of Palmer Eldritch by Philip K. Dick
 Thrice Upon a Time by James P. Hogan
 Through the Heart by Richard Grant
 Tik-Tok by John Sladek
 Time Enough for Love by Robert A. Heinlein
 Time for the Stars by Robert A. Heinlein
 Time Held Me Green and Dying by Dominic Green
 The Time Machine by H. G. Wells
 The Time Traders by Andre Norton (the sequel is Galactic Derelict)
 Timelike Infinity by Stephen Baxter
 Timeline by Michael Crichton
 TimeRiders by Alex Scarrow
 Timescape by Gregory Benford
 Titan by Stephen Baxter
 Titan by John Varley
 To Challenge Chaos by Brian Stableford
 To Die in Italbar by Roger Zelazny
 To Live Forever (a.k.a. Clarges) by Jack Vance
 To the Resurrection Station by Eleanor Arnason
 To the Tombaugh Station by Wilson Tucker
 To Venus in Five Seconds by Fred T. Jane
 To Your Scattered Bodies Go by Philip José Farmer
 Too Like the Lightning by Ada Palmer
 Tower of Glass by Robert Silverberg
Trade Pact by Julie Czerneda
 A Transatlantic Tunnel, Hurrah! by Harry Harrison
 Transmigration by J. T. McIntosh
 Trapped in Space by Jack Williamson
 Treason by Orson Scott Card
 Trouble on Titan by Alan E. Nourse
 Trouble on Triton by Samuel R. Delany
 Trouble with Lichen by John Wyndham
 The Truth Machine by James L. Halperin
 Tunnel in the Sky by Robert A. HeinleinThe Twelve-Fingered Boy by John Hornor Jacobs 
 The Two Faces of Tomorrow by James P. Hogan

U
 Ubik by Philip K. Dick
 Uhura's Song by Janet Kagan
 Uglies series by Scott Westerfeld
 namely, Uglies, Pretties, Specials and Extras Under by Hal Clement (the sequel to Mission of Gravity)
 Under the Green Star by Lin Carter
 The Universe Maker by A. E. van Vogt
 Hans Phaall: A Tale (also known as The Unparalleled Adventure of One Hans Pfaall) by Edgar Allan Poe
 Unveiling a Parallel by Alice Ilgenfritz Jones & Ella Merchant
 Use of Weapons by Iain M. Banks

V
 Valentine Pontifex by Robert Silverberg
 Valis by Philip K. Dick
 The Valley Where Time Stood Still by Lin Carter
 Vandals of the Void by Jack Vance
 Vault of the Ages by Poul Anderson
 Venus series by Edgar Rice Burroughs
 namely, Pirates of Venus, Lost on Venus, Carson of Venus, Escape on Venus and The Wizard of Venus Venus of Dreams by Pamela Sargent
 sequels are Venus of Shadows and Children of Venus La Vermine du Lion by Francis Carsac
 Views from the Oldest House by Richard Grant
 Virtual Light by William Gibson
 The Void Captain's Tale by Norman Spinrad
 Voodoo Planet by Andre Norton
 The Vorkosigan Saga series of books by Lois McMaster Bujold
 namely, Falling Free, Shards of Honor, Barrayar, The Warrior's Apprentice, The Vor Game, Cetaganda, Ethan of Athos, Brothers in Arms, Mirror Dance, Memory, Komarr, A Civil Campaign, Diplomatic Immunity Voyage by Stephen Baxter
 Voyage from Yesteryear by James P. Hogan
 The Voyage of the Space Beagle by A. E. van Vogt
 Voyage to the Bottom of the Sea by Theodore Sturgeon
 Voyager in Night by C. J. Cherryh
 Vulcan's Hammer by Philip K. Dick
 Vurt by Jeff Noon

W
 The Wailing Asteroid by Murray Leinster
 War Against the Chtorr by David Gerrold
 The War Against the Rull by A. E. van Vogt
 War Girls by Tochi Onyebuchi
 The War of the Worlds by H. G. Wells
 War With the Newts (dystopian satire) by Karel Čapek
 The Warlock in Spite of Himself by Christopher Stasheff
 Wasp by Eric Frank Russell
 Watchmen graphic novel by Alan Moore and illustrated by Dave Gibbons
 Water Logic by Laurie J. Marks
 Wave Without a Shore by C. J. Cherryh
 Waves by M. A. Foster
 Way Station by Clifford D. Simak
 We by Yevgeny Zamyatin
 The Weapon Makers by A. E. van Vogt
 The Weapon Shops of Isher by A. E. van Vogt
 What Entropy Means to Me by George Alec Effinger
 When Gravity Fails by George Alec Effinger
 When the Green Star Calls by Lin Carter
 When Harlie Was One by David Gerrold
 Where Time Winds Blow by Robert Holdstock
 The Whisper by Emma Clayton
 White by Ted Dekker
 Who Fears Death by Nnedi Okorafor 
 Wildseed by Octavia Butler
 The Wind from Nowhere by J. G. Ballard
 Windhover Tapes series by Warren Carl Norwood
 namely, An Image of Voices, Fize of the Gabriel Ratchets, Planet of Flowers, and Flexing the Warp The Windup Girl by Paolo Bacigalupi
 Wizard by John Varley
 The Wizard of Linn by A. E. van Vogt
 Wolfbane by Frederik Pohl and C. M. Kornbluth
 Woman On the Edge of Time by Marge Piercy
 The Wondersmith by Fitz James O'Brien
 The World and Thorinn by Damon Knight
 The World at Bay by Paul Capon
 The World Menders by Lloyd Biggle, Jr.
 The World of Null-A by A. E. van Vogt
 The World of Ptavvs by Larry Niven
 A World Out of Time by Larry Niven
 World War Z by Max Brooks
 Worm by John McCrae
 A Wrinkle in Time by Madeleine L'Engle
 Wyrldmaker by Terry Bisson

X
 Xenocide by Orson Scott Card

Y
 The Year of the Quiet Sun by Wilson Tucker
 The Year When Stardust Fell by Raymond F. Jones
 Year Zero, by Robert Reid
 Yesteryear by Alan Dean Foster
 Ylana of Callisto by Lin Carter
 The Young Men are Coming by M. P. Shiel

Z
 The Zap Gun by Philip K. Dick
 Zulu Heart by Steven Barnes
 The Z.'' trilogy, by Stephen Cole
 Z is for Zero by Andy Weir

See also

 List of alternate history fiction
 List of cyberpunk works
 List of fantasy authors
 List of fantasy novels
 List of fantasy story collections
 List of fiction employing parallel universes
 List of science fiction authors
 List of science fiction short stories
 List of Star Trek novels
 List of Star Wars books
 List of steampunk works
 List of time travel science fiction

References

External links
 Classics of Science Fiction - lists and various breakdowns
 Nebula Award Winners
 The Core Reading List of Fantasy and Science Fiction - from NESFA
 Science fiction, fantasy and horror books by award, lists all award-winning books for 14 genre awards
 Best 50 sci-fi novels of all time (Esquire; March 21, 2022)

List of science fiction novels
Lists of novels
Lists of books by genre
Novels